Ochrocesis is a genus of longhorn beetles of the subfamily Lamiinae.

 Ochrocesis evanida Pascoe, 1867
 Ochrocesis myga Kriesche, 1926

References

Astathini
Cerambycidae genera